Mary Jo Markey is an American television and film editor. Markey has been elected to membership of the American Cinema Editors society. She is a frequent collaborator with J. J. Abrams.

Career
Markey has edited several mainstream films including The Perks of Being a Wallflower and Mission: Impossible III. She has also worked as an editor on several television shows, such as three episodes of Felicity, Breaking News, Skin, fourteen episodes of Alias, and was also chief editor on Lost.

She worked with Abrams on three of his television shows (Felicity, Alias, and Lost), and on almost all of his feature films as director with Maryann Brandon, with Star Wars: The Rise of Skywalker being the lone exception. Markey worked with Abrams on Star Wars: The Force Awakens, which was released in December 2015. Along with her co-editor Brandon, she received an Academy Award nomination for Best Film Editing for her work on the film.

In her role editing Abrams' Star Trek, she reported she did not realize that he intended to make extensive use of lens flares and bright lighting, and contacted the film developers asking why the film seemed overexposed.

Filmography
Feature films

Television films

Television series

References

External links
 

Year of birth missing (living people)
Living people
American film editors
American Cinema Editors
Place of birth missing (living people)